William Russell is an American former Negro league pitcher who played in the 1940s.

Russell played for the New York Black Yankees in 1944. In three recorded appearances on the mound, he posted a 5.87 ERA over 7.2 innings.

References

External links
 and Seamheads

Year of birth missing
Place of birth missing
New York Black Yankees players
Baseball pitchers